The OPPO F9 (F9 Pro in India) is the 2018 smartphone from the OPPO F series launched in August 2018. The OPPO F9 features a waterdrop notch design, and is equipped with VOOC fast charging technology. It has a screen to body ratio of 90.8%.

Varun Dhawan was hired as the brand ambassador of OPPO India’s F19 series smartphones.

Specifications

Hardware
The OPPO F9 is powered by a 2GHz octa-core processor, and has 4/6 GB of RAM and 64 GB of storage. It operates on ColorOS 5.2 which is a customized version of Android 8.1 (Oreo). It has both a 25 MP front camera and dual 16 + 2 MP rear cameras. It has a 3500mAh battery and is powered by VOOC fast wired charging which delivers 2 hours of talk time with 5 minutes of charging.

Memory
The OPPO F9 has 64 GB of built in memory and a dedicated Micro SD slot which supports up to 256 GB of additional storage.

Display
The OPPO F9 features a 6.3-inch (160 mm) 1080x2340 pixel, LTPS IPS LCD display, with a pixel density of 409 pixels per inch, and an aspect ratio of 19.5:9. The display is covered by a single pane of Corning Gorilla Glass 6.0.

Battery
The OPPO F9 features a Non-removable Li-Po 3500 mAh battery. It has VOOC Flash Charge, which the company claims to deliver 2-hour of talk time with 5-minutes of charging time.

Audio
The OPPO F9 has included a sound conduction plate to ensure that call quality is not affected by the bezel less design, and the phone retains the 3.5mm audio jack.

Camera
It has two cameras on the rear. One is a 16MP wide-angle camera with f/1.8 aperture, with support for face detection and high dynamic range. The secondary camera features an aperture of f/2.4 and optical image stabilization. The company claims that this phone can identify 16 objects during a shoot in real-time, and uses AI to enhance selfie image quality. The front facing camera is 25-megapixels with an f/2.0 aperture and features face detection and HDR.

Software
The OPPO F9 is equipped with the ColorOS 5.2 which based on Android 8.1 "Oreo" mobile operating system.

References 

Android (operating system) devices
Mobile phones introduced in 2018
Oppo smartphones
Mobile phones with multiple rear cameras
Discontinued smartphones